Lewis James Hatchett (born 21 January 1990) is an English former cricketer. Hatchett is a left-handed batsman who bowls left-arm medium-fast. He was born at Shoreham-by-Sea, Sussex, and was educated at Steyning Grammar School. He was born with Poland syndrome, meaning that he was born without a right pectoral muscle and two ribs.

Hatchett made his first-class debut for Sussex against Cambridge MCCU at Fenner's in May 2010. He claimed his maiden first-class wickets during the match, with the wickets of Stephen Gray and Anand Ashok in Cambridge MCCU's first-innings and Rob Woolley and Peter Turnbull in their second-innings. In July 2010, he made two appearances in the County Championship against Middlesex and Leicestershire. It was against Leicestershire that he claimed his maiden five wicket haul, with figures of 5/47 in Leicestershire's first-innings. He made one further appearance in that season's County Championship, against Worcestershire. At the end of that season, he signed a three-year contract with Sussex, with coach Mark Davis stating "He's an exciting prospect, a left-armer who swings the ball and he's destined for a long and successful career."

When not on Sussex duty, Lewis has played club cricket for East Grinstead Cricket Club in West Sussex, since 2009.

He made just one first-class appearance in 2011, against Oxford MCCU at the University Parks; he again made a single first-class appearance the following year, against Surrey in the County Championship at The Oval.

In September 2016 he retired from cricket following medical advice.

References

External links

1990 births
Living people
People from Shoreham-by-Sea
English cricketers
Sussex cricketers